Guy Busick is an American film and television screenwriter best known for his collaborations with directors Matt Bettinelli-Olpin and Tyler Gillett, including Scream (2022), Ready or Not (2019), and Scream VI (2023).

Career 
In 2016, Busick began his writing career by drafting the story for the thriller film Urge. He transitioned to television by writing episodes of Stan Against Evil and Castle Rock. In 2019, he began his series of collaborations with directors Matt Bettinelli-Olpin and Tyler Gillett by drafting the screenplay for the horror film Ready or Not. In 2020, he continued his collaborations with Bettinelli-Olpin and Gillett with the upcoming horror film Reunion. The following year, he gained notability from writing the script for the slasher revival film Scream. In January 2022, he was hired to script the upcoming horror film Final Destination 6. In February 2022, he wrote the screenplay for Scream VI, a sequel to the 2022 Scream slasher revival.

Filmography

Accolades
His work on Ready or Not was nominated for best screenplay at the 2020 Fangoria Chainsaw Awards.

References

External links 
 

21st-century American male writers
21st-century American screenwriters
American male screenwriters
Living people
Place of birth missing (living people)
Year of birth missing (living people)